Benjamin Thomas Gunter Jr. (August 6, 1902 – March 8, 1980) was an American politician who served as a member of the Virginia Senate.

His father, Ben T. Gunter served in the Senate from 1903 to 1912.

References

External links
 
 

1902 births
1980 deaths
Democratic Party Virginia state senators
20th-century American politicians